The Fula, Fulani, or Fulɓe people are an ethnic group in  Sahel and West Africa, widely dispersed across the region. Inhabiting many countries, they live mainly in West Africa and northern parts of Central Africa, South Sudan, Darfur, and regions near the Red Sea coast in Sudan. The approximate number of Fula people is unknown due to clashing definitions regarding Fula ethnicity. Various estimates put the figure between 25 and 30 million people worldwide.

A significant proportion of the Fula – a third, or an estimated 7 to 10 million – are pastoralists, and their ethnic group has the largest nomadic pastoral community in the world. The majority of the Fula ethnic group consisted of semi-sedentary people as well as sedentary settled farmers, scholars, artisans, merchants, and nobility. As an ethnic group, they are bound together by the Fula language, their history and their culture. More than 99% of the Fula are Muslims.

Many West African leaders are of Fulani descent including the President of Nigeria, Muhammadu Buhari; the President of Senegal, Macky Sall; the President of Gambia, Adama Barrow; the President of Guinea-Bissau, Umaro Sissoco Embaló; the Vice President of Sierra Leone, Mohamed Juldeh Jalloh; and the Prime Minister of Mali, Boubou Cisse. They also occupy positions in major international institutions, such as the Deputy Secretary-General of the United Nations, Amina J. Mohammed; the 74th President of the United Nations General Assembly, Tijjani Muhammad-Bande; and the Secretary-General of OPEC, Mohammed Sanusi Barkindo.

Names

There are many names (and spellings of the names) used in other languages to refer to the Fulɓe. Fulani in English is borrowed from the Hausa term. Fula, from Manding languages, is also used in English, and sometimes spelled Fulah or Fullah. Fula and Fulani are commonly used in English, including within Africa. The French borrowed the Wolof term Pël, which is variously spelled: Peul, Peulh, and even Peuhl. More recently the Fulfulde / Pulaar term Fulɓe, which is a plural noun (singular, Pullo) has been Anglicised as Fulbe, which is gaining popularity in use. In Portuguese, the terms Fula or Futafula are used. The terms Fallata, Fallatah, or Fellata are of Arabic origins, and are often the ethnonyms by which Fulani people are identified by in parts of Chad and Sudan.

Geographic distribution

The Fula people are widely distributed, across the Sahel from the Atlantic coast to the Red Sea, particularly in West Africa. In addition, many also speak other languages of the countries they inhabit, making many Fulani bilingual or even trilingual. Such languages include French, Hausa, Bambara, Wolof, and Arabic.

Major concentrations of Fulani people exist in the Fouta Djallon highlands of central Guinea and south into the northernmost reaches of Sierra Leone; the Futa Tooro savannah grasslands of Senegal and southern Mauritania; the Macina inland Niger river delta system around Central Mali; and especially in the regions around Mopti and the Nioro Du Sahel in the Kayes region; the Borgu settlements of Benin, Togo, and west-central Nigeria; the northern parts of Burkina Faso in the Sahel region's provinces of Seno, Wadalan, and Soum; and the areas occupied by the Sokoto Caliphate, which includes what is now southern Niger and northern Nigeria (such as Tahoua, Katsina, Sokoto, Kebbi, Zinder, Bauchi, Diffa, Yobe, Gombe, and further east, into the Benue River valley systems of north eastern Nigeria and northern Cameroon).

This is the area known as the Fombina/Hombina, literally meaning 'the south' in Adamawa Fulfulde, because it represented the most southern and eastern reaches of Fulɓe hegemonic dominance in West Africa. In this area, Fulfulde is the local lingua franca, and language of cross cultural communication. Further east of this area, Fulani communities become predominantly nomadic, and exist at less organized social systems. These are the areas of the Chari-Baguirmi Region and its river systems, in Chad and the Central African Republic, the Ouaddaï highlands of Eastern Chad, the areas around Kordofan, Darfur and the Blue Nile, Sennar, Kassala regions of Sudan, as well as the Red Sea coastal city of Port Sudan. The Fulani on their way to or back from the pilgrimage to Mecca, Saudi Arabia, settled in many parts of eastern Sudan, today representing a distinct community of over two million people referred to as the Fellata.

While their early settlements in West Africa were in the vicinity of the tri-border point of present-day Mali, Senegal, and Mauritania, they are now, after centuries of gradual migrations and conquests, spread throughout a wide band of West and Central Africa. The Fulani People occupy a vast geographical expanse located roughly in a longitudinal east–west band immediately south of the Sahara, and just north of the coastal rain forest and swamps. There are estimates of 20–25 million Fulani people.

There are generally three different types of Fulani based on settlement patterns, viz: the nomadic-pastoral or Mbororo, the semi-nomadic, and the settled or "town" Fulani. The pastoral Fulani move around with their cattle throughout the year. Typically, they do not stay around for long stretches (not more than 2–4 months at a time). The semi-nomadic Fulani can either be Fulɓe families who happen to settle down temporarily at particular times of the year or Fulɓe families who do not "browse" around past their immediate surroundings, and even though they possess livestock, they do not wander away from a fixed or settled homestead not too far away, they are basically "in-betweeners".

Settled Fulani live in villages, towns, and cities permanently and have given up nomadic life completely, in favor of an urban one. These processes of settlement, concentration, and military conquest led to the existence of organized and long-established communities of Fulani, varying in size from small villages to towns. Today, some major Fulani towns include: Labé, Pita, Mamou, and Dalaba in Guinea; Kaedi, Matam and Podor, Kolda in Senegal and Mauritania; Bandiagara, Mopti, Dori, Gorom-Gorom, and Djibo in Mali and Burkina Faso, on the bend of the Niger; and Birnin Kebbi, Katsina, Gombe, Yola, Digil, Jalingo, Bauchi, Misau, 
Jama'are, Mayo Belwa, Mubi, Maroua, Ngaoundere, Azare ,Dukku, Kumo, Girei, Damaturu, Bertoua, and Garoua in the countries of Cameroon and Nigeria. In most of these communities, the Fulani are usually perceived as a ruling class.

Fulani communities are sometimes grouped and named based on the areas they occupy. Although within each region, there are even further divisions and sub-groupings as well. Below is a list of the main Fulɓe groups.

Typically, Fulɓe belonging to the same affinity bloc tend to cluster together in culture, customs, and dialectal variety. Eastern Fulɓe sub-groups tend to be more similar to each other than to other sub-groups, and the same applies to most western groups. Culturally speaking, the central Fulɓe sub-groups are roughly in between the western and eastern Fulani cultural niches.

For example, the Massina Fulɓe share similarities both dialectally and culturally to Nigerian or Cameroonian (Eastern) (both of which end interrogative questions with "na?"), as well as Senegalese and Guinean (western) Fulɓe cultures (who do not end interrogative questions with such mannerism). Accordingly, the western groups are the most divergent from the eastern groups and vice versa. Overall, however, all share most cultural practices to a large extent.

In Ghana, the exact number of Fulani is unknown due to systematic oppression that includes not counting the Fulani in the Ghanaian census. This reflects widespread discrimination and negative stereotypes about the Fulani.

History
The origins of the Fulani people are unclear and various theories have been postulated. Some scholars on Fulani History and Sokoto Caliphate have traced the lineage of the Torankawa clan (Torodbe) of the Fulani to the Arab conqueror Uqba ibn Nafi. As a nomadic herding people, they have moved through and among many other cultures. Skutsch notes that their oral histories point toward a start in Jordan or farther east, but also that their language comes from the Senegambian region. He concludes that the modern Fulani people began in the northern Senegambian region.

Walter Rodney in his book The History of the Upper Guinea Coast, argues that Fulbe are originally from North Africa and they conquered the Foota Djallon region led by the Fulani Koli Tenguella.

The ethnogenesis of the Fulani people may have begun as a result of interactions between an ancient West African population and North African populations such as Berbers or Egyptians. Their West African roots may be in and around the valley of Senegal River. They likely reflect a genetic intermix of people with West African, North African, and Arabian origins, and have been a part of many ruling dynasties particularly in the Sahel and West Africa. Speculations about their origins started in the era of European conquest and colonization.

Early history

The Fulani may have been involved in the formation of a state with its capital at Takrur which is suggested to have had influx of Fulani migrating from the east and settling in the Senegal valley. although John Donnelly Fage suggests that Takrur was formed through the interaction of Berbers from the Sahara and "Negro agricultural peoples" who were "essentially Serer".

Fulani culture continued to emerge in the area of the upper Niger and Senegal Rivers. The Fulani were cattle-keeping farmers who shared their lands with other nearby groups, like the Soninke, who contributed to the rise of ancient Ghana, with eastward and westward expansion being led by nomadic groups of cattle breeders or the Fulɓe ladde. While the initial expansionist groups were small, they soon increased in size due to the availability of grazing lands in the Sahel and the lands that bordered it to the immediate south.

Agricultural expansions led to a division among the Fulani, where individuals were classified as belonging either to the group of expansionist nomadic agriculturalists or the group of Fulani who found it more comfortable to abandon traditional nomadic ways and settle in towns or the Fulɓe Wuro. Fulani towns were a direct result of nomadic heritage and were often founded by individuals who had simply chosen to settle in a given area instead of continuing on their way.

This cultural interaction most probably occurred in Senegal, where the closely linguistically related Toucouleur, Serer and Wolof people predominate, ultimately leading to the ethnogenesis of the Fulani culture, language and people before subsequent expansion throughout much of West Africa. Another version is that they were originally a Berber speaking people who crossed Senegal to pasture their cattle on the Ferlo Desert south of the Senegal River. Finding themselves cut off from their kinsmen by the other communities now occupying the fertile Senegal valley, they gradually adopted the language of their new neighbours. As their herds increased, small groups found themselves forced to move eastward and further southwards and so initiated a series of migrations throughout West Africa, which endures to the present day.

Evidence of Fulani migration as a whole, from the Western to Eastern Sudan is very fragmentary. Delafosse, one of the earliest enquirers into Fulani history and customs, principally relying on oral tradition, estimated that Fulani migrants left Fuuta-Tooro, and Macina, towards the east, between the eleventh and the fourteenth centuries. By the 15th century, there was a steady flow of Fulɓe immigrants into Hausaland and, later on, Bornu. Their presence in Baghirmi was later recorded when Fulani fought as allies, to Dokkenge or Birni Besif, when he founded Massenya (a Chadian town), early in the 16th century.

By the end of the 18th century, Fulani settlements were dotted all over the Benue River valley and its tributaries. They spread eastwards towards Garoua and Rey Bouba, and southwards towards the Faro River, to the foot of the Mambilla Plateau, which they would later ascend in subsequent years. The heaviest concentrations of their settlements were at Gurin, Chamba territory, Cheboa, Turua and Bundang. These so-called "Benue-Fulani" reduced the frequency with which they moved from place to place. The number of years they stayed at one spot depended on two factors: the reaction of the earlier settlers of that locality to their presence, and how satisfactory the conditions were, i.e., availability of pastures for their cattle.

Settlement and Islam

Fula people adopted Islam early. According to David Levison, adopting Islam made the Fulani feel a "cultural and religious superiority to surrounding peoples, and that adoption became a major ethnic boundary marker" between them and other African ethnic groups in the Sahel and West Africa. Settled and nomadic Fulani became political and warring entities, armed with horses and equipment of war from the north. The wars were not merely between Fula people and other ethnic groups, but also internecine between the pastoral and sedentary Fulani, where sometimes they worked in cohesion, and other times the Muslim Fulani leaders attacked the nomadic Fulani as infidels.

The Songhai Empire rulers had converted to Sunni Islam in the 11th-century and were a major trading partner of the Middle East and North Africa. The Fulani warriors, in the 15th century, challenged this West African trading state near the Niger River, but were repulsed. In 1493, Askia Muhammad I led the Fulani people from western Sudan, and over time gained control of much that was previously Songhai empire, removing Sonni Baru who had attempted to protect the interests of pastoralists. Askia Muhammad won control over the caravan trade routes in West Africa, but was overthrown by his own son, Askia Musa, in a coup in 1528.

The Fulani, after being the first group of people in West Africa to convert to Islam, became active in supporting Islamic theology and ideology from centres such as Timbuktu. The Fula people who later became known as the Toroobe worked with Berber and Arabian Islamic clerics, charting out the spread of Islam in West Africa. The Fula people led many jihads, or holy wars, some of which were major. These war efforts helped spread Islam in West Africa, as well as helped them dominate much of the Sahel region of West Africa during the medieval and pre-colonial era, establishing them not only as a religious group but also as a political and economic force.

Theocratic wars and Islamic lineages in West Africa
Futa Toro was established in the 1500s, by Denianke dynasty built out of Fulani and Mandinka forces; the importance of Fula people to this rule led to this era known as Empire of Great Fulo. The Fulani raided and violently disrupted the trade routes that accounted for the economic prosperity of older African kingdoms, and thus began their rise. Futa Bundu, sometimes called Bondu and located in Senegal and Faleme rivers confluence, became a centre for the rise of West Africa-wide Fula empire and influence in 17th century. From the 18th century onwards, the frequency of Jihads increased such as those led by Ibrahim Sori and Karamoko Ali in 1725, the Fulani became a hegemonic force and were politically dominant in many areas. The region was engulfed in theocratic wars, with many Islamic lineages seeking political power and control. The Moroccans invaded the western Sahel adding to an anarchical situation. Food production plummeted, and during this periods famine plagued the region, negatively affecting the political situation and increasing the trigger for militant control of the economic activity.

Over time, the Fulɓe empire split among the later descendants and developed into many emirates. The main nuclei of Fulɓe power were the polities in the Senegal River Valley, the Fuuta Jallon mountains, in Guinea, the Inland Delta of the Niger in Mali (Maasina), the north of Nigeria and the Adamawa Plateau in Cameroon. In between these big centres there were numerous small polities dominated by the Fulɓe in the central Gourma of present-day Mali and the north and west of Burkina Faso (Jelgoji, Boboola, Dori, Liptako), northern Benin (Borgu), the Sene-Gambia, northern Senegal (Bundu), and the southern and western parts of present-day Niger (Dallol Bosso, Birni N'konni).

Imamate of Futa Jallon

The Emirate / Imamate of Timbo in the Fuuta Jallon was the first of the Fulɓe emirates in West Africa. It developed from a revolt by Islamic Fulɓe against their oppression by the pagan Pulli (فُلِی or 𞤆𞤵𞤤𞥆𞤭, non-Islamic Fulɓe), and the Jallonke (the original Mande inhabitants of the Fuuta-Jallon), during the first half of the 18th century. The first ruler took the title of Almaami and resided in Timbo, near the modern-day town of Mamou. The town became the political capital of the newly formed Imamate, with the religious capital was located in Fugumba. The Council of Elders of the Futa Jallon state were also based in Fugumba, acting as a brake on the Almami's powers.

The newly formed imamate was mostly located mainly in present-day Guinea, but also spanned parts of modern-day Guinea Bissau, Senegal, and Sierra Leone. This emirate was, in fact, a federal state of nine provinces: Timbo, Fugumbaa, Ɓuuriya, Koyin, Kollaaɗe, Keebaali, Labe, Fode-Hajji, and Timbi. After the Muslim Fulɓe victory, other ethnic groups who had resisted the jihad were deprived of their rights to land except for a small piece for their subsistence and were reduced to servitude. The nomad Pulli Fulɓe lost all freedom of movement, and thus, began to settle en-masse. The Jalonke lost their noble status and became slaves (maccuɓe).

Later, due to strife between two branches of the Seediayanke royal lineage, (the Soriya and the Alphaya), a system for the rotation of office between these branches was set up. This led to an almost permanent state of civil strife since none of the parties was inclined to respect the system, which considerably weakened the power of the political centre.

The Empire of Massina

The Maasina Emirate also called Diina (𞤈𞤭𞥄𞤲𞤢, "religion" in Fulfulde, with Arabic origins), was established by the Fulbe jihad led by Sheeku Aamadu in 1818. The origins of the Maasina Emirate in the Inner Delta of the Niger are also found in rebellion, this time against the Bambara / Bamana Kingdom of Segou, a political power that controlled the region from outside. This jihad was inspired by events in northern Nigeria where an important scholar of the time, Usman Dan Fodio, established an Islamic empire with Sokoto as its capital.

For some time, groups of Fulbe had been dominant in parts of the delta, thereby creating a complex hierarchy dating back through several waves of conquest. However, due to internecine warfare, they were never able to organize a countervailing force against the Bamana Kingdom. In 1818, an Islamic cleric named Aamadu Hammadi Buubu united the Fulbe under the banner of Islam and fought a victorious battle against the Bamana and their allies. He subsequently established his rule in the Inland Delta and the adjacent dry lands east and west of the delta.

This state appears to have had tight control over its core area, as evidenced by the fact that its political and economic organization is still manifested today in the organization of agricultural production in the Inland Delta. Despite its power and omnipresence, the hegemony of the emirate was constantly threatened. During the reign of Aamadu Aamadu, the grandson of Sheeku Aamadu, internal contradictions weakened the emirate until it became easy prey for the forces of the Futanke, which subsequently overthrew the Maasina Emirate, in 1862.

The Futanke / Toucouleur Empire

Many regard the Futanke or Toucouleur conquest of western Sudan and central Mali as a reform movement. The character of the Futanke Emirate was somewhat different, although its founding was related to the conquest of the Maasina Emirate and the Bamana Kingdoms of Segou and Kaarta in the aftermath of a movement for reform. Threatened by French colonial forces while at the same time being supplied with firearms by them, the Futanke staged a jihad to fight paganism and the competing Islamic brotherhood of the Tijannya.

Its founder, El Hadj Umar Tall an Islamic reformer originating from the Fuuta Tooro on the banks of the Senegal River, died fighting against rebels shortly after his forces defeated the Maasina Emirate. After El Hadj Umar's death, the emirate was divided into three states, each ruled by one of his sons. These three states had their capitals respectively in the towns of Nioro, Segou and Bandiagara. A most important distinction was between noblemen (free people) and the non-free (Rimmaibe or Maccube).

The noblemen consisted of the ruling class of political overlords and Islamic clerics, as well as the pastoral Fulbe populations, who helped them come to power. Together, they formed a group of vassals to the political elite and were considered noblemen, although, in reality, their political influence was minimal. The conquered populations were reduced to servitude or slavery and more slaves were captured to provide enough labour for the functioning of the economy. Also, there were groups of bards, courtiers and artisans who occupied lower political and social positions.

The Sokoto Caliphate and its various emirates

The Sokoto Caliphate was by far the largest and most successful legacy of Fulani power in Western Africa. It was the largest, as well as the most well-organized, of the Fulani Jihad states. Throughout the 19th century, Sokoto was one of the largest and most powerful empires in West Africa until 1903, when defeated by European colonial forces. The Sokoto Caliphate included several emirates, the largest of which was Adamawa, although the Kano Emirate was the most populated. Others included, but are not limited to: Gombe Emirate, Gwandu Emirate, Bauchi Emirate, Katsina Emirate, Zazzau Emirate, Hadejia Emirate, and Muri Emirate.

While establishing their hegemony, the Fulbe defined a strict social hierarchy and imposed limitations on economic and trading activities, the purpose of which was to ensure a constant flow of tax revenue and commodities to the state apparatus and the standing army, especially for the cavalry. The freedom for pastoralists to move around was curtailed to ensure the smooth functioning of other production activities, such as cereal cultivation and, in the case of Maasina, of fishing activities.

There appears to be considerable resistance to the forced acceptance of Islam by these emirates. For example, many nomadic Fulbe, predominantly Wodaabe fled northern Nigeria when their liberty was curtailed and they were forced to convert to Islam following the jihads instigated by Usman Dan Fodio from Sokoto. Conversion to Islam meant not only changing one's religion but also submitting to rules dealing with every aspect of social, political and cultural life, intrusions with which many nomadic Fulbe were not comfortable.

Abdullahi dan Fodio, brother of Shehu dan Fodio stated that Torankawa (Turubbi/Torobe) are part Fulani, and part Arabs, they are Arabs through Uqba ibn Nafi who was an Arab Muslim of the Umayyad branch of the Quraysh, and hence, a member of the family of the Prophet, Uqba ibn Nafi allegedly married a Fulani woman called Bajjumangbu through which the Torodbe family of Usman dan Fodio descended. Caliph Muhammed Bello writing in his book Infaq al-Mansur claimed descent from Prophet Muhammad through his paternal grandmother's lineage called Hawwa(mother of Usman dan Fodio), Alhaji Muhammadu Junaidu, Wazirin Sokoto restated the claims of Shaykh Abdullahi bin Fodio in respect of the Danfodio family been part Arabs and part Fulani, while Ahmadu Bello in his autobiography written after independence replicated Caliph's Muhammadu Bello claim of descent from the Arabs through Usman Danfodio's mother, taking the historical account the family of Shehu dan Fodio are partly Arabs and partly Fulani who culturally assimilated with the Hausas and can be described as Hausa-Fulani Arabs.

Timeline of Fulani history

New Fulani Olig

Society

The Fulani, migrant Arabs and Hausa people have taken some influences from each other's cultures. Upon the success recorded in the 1804 Fulani War of Usman dan Fodio, who is claimed to be partly Arab and partly Fulani, many Arabs and Fulɓe subsequently joined the ruling classes of the Northern Nigerian Emirate. They dress and speak like their Hausa neighbours and live in the same form (see Hausa–Fulani and Hausa-Fulani Arabs). The Fulɓe who didn't settle during this period and their descendants, however, still keep an obvious distinct identity from that of the Hausa and other surrounding groups of the region. This Hausa–Fulani interaction is uncommon outside the eastern subregion of West Africa.

The Toucouleur people in the central Senegal River valley are closely related to the Fula people. During the medieval era, they paid a tribute to the Fula. Large numbers of other Fula-speakers live scattered in the region and have a lower status. They are descendants of Fula-owned slaves. Now legally emancipated, in some regions they still pay tribute to Fula elites, and they are often denied chances for upward social mobility.

In Mali, Burkina Faso and Senegal for instance, those within the Fulɓe cultural sphere, but who are not ethnically Fula, are referred to as yimɓe pulaaku (𞤴𞤭𞤥𞤩𞤫 𞤆𞤵𞤤𞤢𞥄𞤳𞤵, "people of the Fula culture"). As such, Fulani culture includes people who may or may not be ethnic Fulani. Although slavery is now illegal, memories of the past relationship between Fulɓbe and Rimayɓe are still very much alive in both groups. Paul Riesman, an American ethnographer who resided among the Jelgooji Fulɓbe of Burkina Faso in the 1980s, states that the Fulɓe are tall, slim, and light-skinned; they have thin straight noses, and their hair tends to be long and curly. In contrast, the Rimayɓe are stocky, tending towards corpulence, dark-skinned with flat 'squashed' noses, and short kinky hair.

Slavery and caste system
The first Fulani people who were forcibly expatriated to America during the Atlantic slave trade came from several parts of West and Central Africa. Many Fulani slaves came from places such as Guinea, Senegal, Guinea-Bissau, Sierra Leone, Nigeria and Cameroon. Most of the slaves who came from Senegal belonged to Fula and Mandinga peoples. Some of the most common names found on the Registry of Liberated Africans were Fulani in origin. Many of the captors and perpetrators of raids providing sources for the European slave merchants were also Fulani.

Fula society features the caste divisions typical of the West African region. The fairly rigid caste system of the Fula people has medieval roots, was well established by the 15th-century, and it has survived into modern age. The four major castes, states Martin Kich, in their order of status are "nobility, traders, tradesmen (such as blacksmith) and descendants of slaves". According to the African Commission on Human and Peoples' Rights, the Fulani people have held on to "a strict caste system".

There are the Fulani proper, also referred to as the Fulɓe, including the Pullo (also called the Rimɓe (singular)) and the Dimo, meaning "noble". There is the artisan caste, including blacksmiths, potters, griots, genealogists, woodworkers, and dressmakers. They belong to castes but are free people. Then there are those castes of captive, slave or serf ancestry: the Maccuɗo, Rimmayɓe, Dimaajo, and less often Ɓaleeɓe, the Fulani equivalent of the Tuareg Ikelan known as Bouzou (Buzu)/Bella in the Hausa and Songhay languages respectively. The Fulani rulers and merchants were, like many other ruling ethnic groups of Africa, also involved in the trans-Atlantic slave trade, sourcing the enslaved people through raids and from captives they took by waging war. Many Fulani were enslaved and raided by ethnic groups who adhere to Traditional African religions.

The Fulani castes are endogamous in nature, meaning individuals marry only within their caste. This caste system, however, wasn't as elaborate in places like northern Nigeria, Eastern Niger or Cameroon. According to some estimates, by the late 19th century, slaves constituted about 50% of the population of the Fulɓe-ruled Adamawa Emirate, where they were referred to as jeyaɓe (singular jeyado). Though very high, these figures are representative of many other emirates of the Sokoto Caliphate, of which Adamawa formed a part. The castes-based social stratification among the Fula people was widespread and seen across the Sahel, such as Burkina Faso, Niger, Senegal, Guinea, Mali, Nigeria, Sudan, and others.

Culture

Traditional livelihood

The Fulani are traditionally a nomadic, pastoralist trading people. They herd cattle, goats and sheep across the vast dry hinterlands of their domain, keeping somewhat separate from the local agricultural populations. They are the largest nomadic ethnic group in the world and inhabit several territories over an area larger in size than the continental United States. The pastoral lifestyle of the herders' tribe makes it complicated for a non-member to date or marry a Fulani woman.

The Fulani follow a code of behaviour known as pulaaku, which consists of the qualities of patience, self-control, discipline, prudence, modesty, respect for others (including foes), wisdom, forethought, personal responsibility, hospitality, courage, and hard work. Among the nomadic Fulani, women in their spare time make handicrafts including engraved gourds, weavings, knitting, beautifully made covers for calabashes known as mbeedu, and baskets. The Fulani men are less involved in the production of crafts such as pottery, iron-working, and dyeing, unlike males from neighbouring ethnic groups around them.

In virtually every area of West Africa, where the nomadic Fulɓe reside, there has been an increasing trend of conflicts between farmers (sedentary) and grazier (pastoral nomadic). There have been numerous such cases on the Jos Plateau, the Western High Plateau, the Central/Middle Belt regions of Nigeria, Northern Burkina Faso, and Southern Chad. The rearing of cattle is a principal activity in four of Cameroon's ten administrative regions as well as three other provinces with herding on a lesser scale, throughout the North and Central regions of Nigeria, as well as the entire Sahel and Sudan region.

For decades there have been intermittent skirmishes between the Woɗaaɓe Bororo (graziers) and sedentary farmers such as the Jukun, Tiv, Chamba, Bamileke, Wurkum, Bachama, Jenjo, Mbula, Berom, Mumuye, Kare Kare, and sometimes even the Hausa. Such conflicts usually begin when cattle have strayed into farmlands and destroyed crops. Thousands of Fulani have been forced to migrate from their traditional homelands in the Sahel, to areas further south, because of increasing encroachment of Saharan desertification. Nigeria alone loses  of cattle rangeland and cropland every year to desertification, posing serious threats to the livelihoods of about 20 million people.

Recurrent droughts have meant that a lot of traditional herding families have been forced to give up their nomadic way of life, losing a sense of their identity in the process. Increasing urbanization has also meant that a lot of traditional Fulani grazing lands have been taken for developmental purposes, or forcefully converted into farmlands. These actions often result in violent attacks and reprisal counterattacks being exchanged between the Fulani, who feel their way of life and survival are being threatened, and other populations who often feel aggrieved from loss of farm produce even if the lands they farm on were initially barren and uncultivated.

Fulani in Nigeria have often requested for the development of exclusive grazing reserves, to curb conflicts. All the leading presidential aspirants of previous elections seeking Fulɓe votes have made several of such failed promises in their campaigns. Discussions among government officials, traditional rulers, and Fulani leaders on the welfare of the pastoralists have always centred on requests and pledges for protecting grazing spaces and cattle passages. The growing pressure from Ardo'en (the Fulani community leaders) for the salvation of what is left of the customary grazing land has caused some state governments with large populations of herders (such as Gombe, Bauchi, Adamawa, Taraba, Plateau, and Kaduna) to include in their development plans the reactivation and preservation of grazing reserves. Quick to grasp the desperation of cattle-keepers for land, the administrators have instituted a Grazing Reserve Committee to find a lasting solution to the rapid depletion of grazing land resources in Nigeria.

The Fulani believe that the expansion of the grazing reserves will boost livestock population, lessen the difficulty of herding, reduce seasonal migration, and enhance the interaction among farmers, pastoralists, and rural dwellers. Despite these expectations, grazing reserves are not within the reach of about three-quarters of the nomadic Fulani in Nigeria, who number in the millions, and about sixty per cent of migrant pastoralists who use the existing grazing reserves keep to the same reserves every year. The number and the distribution of the grazing reserves in Nigeria range from insufficient to severely insufficient for Fulani livestock. In countries like Nigeria, Cameroon, and Burkina Faso where meat supplies are entirely dependent on the Fulani, such conflicts lead to scarcity and hikes in animal protein prices. In recent times, the Nigerian senate and other lawmakers have been bitterly divided in attempts to pass bills on grazing lands and migration "corridors" for Fulani herdsmen. This was mainly due to Southern and Central Nigerian lawmakers opposing the proposal, and Northern Lawmakers being in support. Fulani extremists are involved in several communal conflicts in Nigeria. According to the Global Terrorism Index, a continuous sequence of Fulani attacks across West Africa have occurred in Mali, Central African Republic, Democratic Republic of Congo, and Cameroon. The cumulative fatalities in these attacks is in the thousands.

Language

The language of the Fulani is "Pulaar" 𞤆𞤵𞤤𞤢𞥄𞤪, which is also the language of the Toucouleurs. All Senegalese and Mauritanians who speak the language natively are known as the Halpulaar (𞤖𞤢𞤤𞤨𞤵𞤤𞤢𞥄𞤪) or Haalpulaar'en (𞤖𞤢𞥄𞤤𞤵𞤤𞤢𞥄𞤪𞥇𞤫𞤲), which means "speakers of Pulaar" ("hal" is the root of the Pulaar verb haalugol 𞤖𞤢𞥄𞤤𞤵𞤺𞤮𞤤, meaning "to speak"). In some areas, e.g. in northern Cameroon, Fulfulde is a local lingua franca.

There are three writing systems used to write this language: an Arabic derived one called Ajami, a Latin derived system with 6 sets, and a native phonetic-faithful system called Adlam recently invented in 1989; the third one is the most increasingly popular not only learnt by hundreds of thousands of people among the diaspora worldwide but has also apps and computer programs created to assist in the script's adoption.

Moral code
Central to the Fulani people's lifestyle is a code of behavior known as pulaaku (Fulfulde: 𞤆𞤵𞤤𞤢𞥄𞤳𞤵) or laawol Fulɓe (𞤂𞤢𞥄𞤱𞤮𞤤 𞤆𞤵𞤤𞤩𞤫) literally meaning the "Fulani pathways" which are passed on by each generation as high moral values of the Fulbe, which enable them to maintain their identity across boundaries and changes of lifestyle. Essentially viewed as what makes a person Fulani, or "Fulaniness", pulaaku includes:

 Munyal: Patience, self-control, discipline, prudence
 Gacce / Semteende: Modesty, respect for others (including foes)
 Hakkille: Wisdom, forethought, personal responsibility, hospitality
 Sagata / Tiinaade: Courage, hard work

Dress

There are no particular outfits for all Fulani sub-groups; dressing and clothing accessories such as ornaments mostly depend on the particular region. The traditional dress of the Fulbe Wodaabe consists of long colourful flowing robes, modestly embroidered or otherwise decorated. In the Futa Jallon highlands of central Guinea, it is common to see men wearing a distinctive hat with colorful embroidery. In Nigeria, Cameroon and Niger, men wear a hat that tapers off at three angular tips, known as a noppiire. Both men and women wear a characteristic white or black cotton fabric gown, adorned with intricate blue, red and green thread embroidery work, with styles differing according to region and sex. 

It is not uncommon to see the women decorate their hair with bead hair accessories as well as cowrie shells. Fula women often use henna for hand, arm and feet decorations. Their long hair is put into five long braids that either hang or are sometimes looped on the sides. It is common for women and girls to have silver coins and amber attached to their braids. Some of these coins are very old and have been passed down in the family. The women often wear many bracelets on their wrists. The women can also be seen wearing a colorful cloth (modjaare) around, the waist, head or over one shoulder.

Like the men, the women have markings on their faces around their eyes and mouths that they were given as children. The Western Fulbe in countries like Mali, Senegal and Mauritania use indigo inks around the mouth, resulting in a blackening around the lips and gums.

Fulani men are often seen wearing solid-colored shirt and pants which go down to their lower calves, made from locally grown cotton, a long cloth wrapped around their faces, and a conical hat made from straw and leather on their turbans, and carrying their walking sticks across their shoulders with their arms resting on top of it. Often the men have markings on either side of their faces and/or on their foreheads. They received these markings as children. Fula ethics are strictly governed by the notion of pulaaku. Women wear long robes with flowery shawls. They decorate themselves with necklaces, earrings, nose rings and anklets.

Herding

Fula are primarily known to be pastoralists, but are also traders in some areas. Most Fula in the countryside spend long times alone on foot, and can be seen frequently parading with their cattle throughout the west African hinterland, moving their herds in search of water and better pasture. They were, and still are, the only major migratory people group of West Africa, although the Tuareg people, another nomadic tribe of North African origin, live just immediately north of Fula territory, and sometimes live alongside the Fulani in countries such as Mali, Niger and Burkina Faso. The Fulani, as a result of their constant wandering of the past, can be seen in every climatic zone and habitat of West Africa, from the deserts of the north, to the derived savannah and forests of the south.

From the 16th to 20th centuries many Fulani communities settled in the highlands of the Jos Plateau, the Western High Plateau of Bamenda, and Adamawa Plateau of Nigeria and the Cameroons. These are the highest elevated places in West Africa, and their altitude can reach up to 8,700 feet above sea level. The highland plateaus have a more temperate climate conducive for cattle herding activities, which allowed Fulbe populations to settle there in waves of migrations from further west. Though most Fula now live in towns or villages, a large proportion of the population is still either fully nomadic, or semi-nomadic in nature.

Wealth is counted by how large the herd of cattle is. Long ago Fulani tribes and clans used to fight over cattle and grazing rights. Being the most treasured animal that the Fulanis herd, the cows are very special. Many people say that a person cannot speak Fulfulde if he does not own a cow. The Fulani have a tradition of giving a habbanaya – a cow which is loaned to another until she calves. Once the calf is weaned it is retained and the cow is returned to its owner. This habbanaya is a highly prized animal. Upon receipt of this gift, there is a special ceremony in honor of the gift. The recipient buys special treats and invites his neighbors for this event in which the habbanaya is given a name. The habbanaya is never to be struck under any circumstance.

Fulani nomads keep various species of cattle, but the zebu is the most common in the West African hinterland, due to its drought resistant traits. In the wetter areas of Fouta Djallon and Casamance, the dwarf N'Dama is more common, as they are highly resistant to trypanosomiasis and other conditions directly associated with high humidity. Subspecies of zebu include the White Fulani cattle, locally known as the Aku, Akuji, Bororoji, White Kano, Yakanaji or Bunaji, which are an important beef breed of cattle found throughout the area owned by both Fulani and Hausa people and beyond in the Sahel zone of Africa.

The Red Fulani cattle, which are called the Jafun  in Nigeria and Cameroon, and Fellata in Chad, as well as other names such as the M'Bororo, Red Bororo, or Bodaadi, another subspecies is the Sokoto Gudali and the Adamawa Gudali or simply Gudali, which means "horned and short legged" in the Hausa language. The widely accepted theory for the origin of present-day zebu cattle in West Africa is that they came from the westward spread of the early zebu populations in East Africa through the Sudan. Other breeds of zebu are found mainly in the drier regions. Their body conformation resembles the zebu cattle of eastern Africa. The zebu did not appear in West Africa until about 1800. The increasing aridity of the climate and the deterioration of the environment in the Sahel appear to have favoured the introduction and spread of the zebu, as they are superior to longhorn and shorthorn cattle in withstanding drought conditions.

The origins and classification of the Fulani remains controversial; one school of thought is of the opinion that the Fulani cattle are truly long-horned zebus that first arrived in Africa from Asia on the east coast; these are believed to have been introduced into West Africa by Arab invaders during the seventh century, roughly about the same time that the short-horned zebus arrived into East Africa. This theory is supported by the appearance of the skull as well as the thoracic hump of the Fulani cattle.

Another school of thought contends that these cattle originated from the Horn of Africa, present-day Ethiopia and Somalia, and that interbreeding between the short-horned zebu (which arrived in the Horn around the first millennium BC) and the ancient Hamitic Longhorn and/or B. taurus brachyceros shorthorn (which had arrived much earlier) occurred in the Horn about 2000–1500 BCE. The subsequent successive introductions of the short-horned zebu are believed to have displaced most sanga cattle into southern Africa.

During this period of constant movement of people and animals within Africa, some of these sanga cattle probably intermixed with the short-horned, thoracic-humped cattle to produce the thoracic-humped sanga. The latter may have migrated, most probably along with the spread of Islam, westerly to constitute what are today the lyre-horned cattle of West and Central Africa, including the Fulani cattle. Originally the White Fulani were indigenous to north Nigeria, southeast Niger and northeast Cameroon, owned by both Fulani and Hausa people. They then spread to southern Chad and western Sudan.

Every year, in the Malian town of Diafarabé, Fulani men cross the Niger River with their cattle, in an annual cycle of transhumance. This annual festival is known in the local Fulfulde as the Dewgal. Since the founding of the village in 1818, it has always been the most important Fulani festival. It takes place on a Saturday in November or December; the day is carefully chosen based on the state of pastures and the water levels in the river Niger. During the rainy season, the river swells, and the areas around the village are inundated in water, as the level of the river Niger rises, and turns Diafarabe into an island. The cattle are kept on the lush fields up north or south, but when the West African Monsoon subsides and the drier season returns, the water level drops and the cattle can return home again.

The crossing is more than a search for pastures; it is also a competition to show craftsmanship as a herdsmen. The cattle are driven into the river, and each herder, with no help from others, loudly encourages the animals to move forward as he stands or swims between them, holding on to the horns of the bulls. The smaller animals don't have to swim, but are lifted into pirogues. When all the cattle are back, they are judged by a panel, which decides whose animals are the "fattest". That herder is awarded "best caretaker", and he is awarded by the community. The worst caretaker ends up with a shameful "prize" – a peanut.

Besides being a competition of herdsmanship, it is also a social event; the herdsmen return after having been away for the most part of the year and they meet their family and friends again. It is a time for celebration. The women decorate their house with woven mats and paint the floor with white and black clay, braid their hair with very intricate patterns, and dress up for their husbands and loved ones. Impressed by the cultural significance attached to the annual event, UNESCO included it on its list of world cultural heritage events.

Music

The Fula have a rich musical culture and play a variety of traditional instruments including drums, hoddu (a plucked skin-covered lute similar to a banjo), and riti or riiti (a one-string bowed instrument similar to a violin), in addition to vocal music. The well-known Senegalese Fula musician Baaba Maal sings in Pulaar on his recordings. Zaghareet or ululation is a popular form of vocal music formed by rapidly moving the tongue sideways and making a sharp, high sound.

Fulani music is as varied as its people. The numerous sub-groups all maintain unique repertoires of music and dance. Songs and dances reflect traditional life and are specifically designed for each individual occasion. Music is played at any occasion: when herding cattle, working in the fields, preparing food, or at the temple. Music is extremely important to the village life cycle, with field cultivation, harvest and winnowing of millet performed to the rhythm of the songs and drums.

Fulani herders have a special affinity for the flute and violin nianioru. The young Fulani shepherd like to whistle and sing softly as they wander the silent savannah with cattle and goats. The truly Fulani instruments are the one-string viola of the Fulani (nianioru), the flute, the two to five string lute hoddu or molo, and the buuba and bawdi set of drums. But they are also influenced by the other instruments of the region such as the beautiful West African harp, the kora, and the balafon. Entertainment is the role of certain casts. The performance of music is the realm of specialized casts. The Griots or Awlube recite the history of the people, places and events of the community.

Food

It is common to see Fulani women hawking milk products in characteristic beautifully decorated calabashes balanced on their heads. Other meals include a heavy porridge made of flour from such grains as millet, sorghum, or corn which is eaten in combination with soup made from tomatoes, onions, spices, peppers, and other vegetables.

The Wodaabe traditionally eat millet, milk and meat as staples. Millet is eaten in the morning, noon and night as a grease with a sauce or stew which usually contains tomatoes, peppers, bone, meat, onion, and other vegetables. On special occasions they eat meat such as goat or beef. A thick beverage similar to the Tuareg  is made by pounding goat cheese, milk, dates and millet.

Houses

Traditionally, nomadic Fula live in domed houses known as a bukkaru or suudu hudo, literally "grass house". During the dry season, the characteristically hemisphere-shaped domed houses are supported by compact millet stalk pillars, and by reed mats held together and tied against wood poles, in the wet or rainy season. These mobile houses are very easy to set up, and dismantle, as typical of houses from nomadic societies. When it is time to move, the houses are easily disassembled and loaded onto donkeys, horses or camels for transport. With recent trends however, many Fula now live in mud or concrete block houses.

Once they are set up, the room is divided into a sleeping compartment, and another compartment where calabashes and guards of all sizes are intricately arranged in a stack according to their sizes and functions. Spoons made from gourda are hung from the rooftop, with others meant for grain storage.

Genetics

The Fulani people are genetically an admixture of West and East African ancestries, specifically Niger-Congo and Nilo-Saharan components, but also display varying degrees of West-Eurasian admixture through contact with groups from Northern African. The Fulani are the most wide-spread pastoralist group in the Sahel/Savannah belt.

Paternal lineages (Y-DNA) 
The paternal lineages of the Fula/Fulɓe/Fulani tend to vary depending on geographic location. According to a study by Cruciani et al. (2002), around 90% of Fulani individuals from Burkina Faso carried haplotype 24, which corresponds with the E-M2 (E1b1a) that is common in West Africa. The remainder belonged to haplotype 42/haplogroup E-M132. Both of these clades are today most frequent among Niger–Congo-speaking populations, particularly those inhabiting Senegal. Similarly, 53% of the Fulani in northern Cameroon bore haplogroup E-M132, with the rest mainly carrying other African clades (12% haplogroup A and 6% haplogroup E1b1a). A significant minority carried the West Eurasian haplogroups T (18%) and R1 (12%), making up together around ~30% of the total haplogroup variation. Mulcare et al. (2004) observed a similar frequency of haplogroup R1 subclades in their Fulani samples from Cameroon (18%).

A study by Hassan et al. (2008) on a Fulani subgroup in Sudan observed a significantly higher occurrence of the West-Eurasian haplogroup R1 (53.8%). The remainder belonged to E-M215 subclades, including 34.62% E-M78 and 27.2% E-V22. Bučková et al. (2013) analyzed various Fulani subgroups, and observed R1b among the Fulani Zinder grouping with a frequency of ~31%. This was in sharp contrast to most of the other Fulani pastoralist groups elsewhere, including those from Burkina Faso, Cameroon, Mali and Chad, which instead had nearly exclusive West African paternal haplogroups.

Maternal lineages (mtDNA)
In contrast to their more heterogeneous paternal lineages, the Fulani have rather homogenous maternal lineages, with close affinity to other Niger-Congo populations. Only 8.1% of their mtDNA clades were associated with West Eurasian or Afro-Asiatic groups (J1b, U5, H, and V).

A study of four Fulani nomad populations (n = 186) in three Sahelian countries (Chad, Cameroon, and Burkina Faso), found that the only group of nomadic Fulani that manifests some similarities with geographically related agricultural populations (from Guinea-Bissau and Nigeria) comes from Tcheboua in northern Cameroon.

Autosomal DNA (overall)
According to Tishkoff et al. (2009), the Fulani's genomic ancestry clusters near that of Chadic and Central Sudanic speaking populations, with genetic affinities observed to the Hausa people. Based on this, the researchers suggest that the Fulani may have adopted a Niger-Congo language at some point in their history, while intermarrying with local populations. Additionally, moderate levels of West Eurasian admixture was also observed among the Fulani samples, which the authors propose may have been introduced via the Iberian Peninsula and Northern Africa. Dobon et al. (2015), found that the Sudanese Fulani have largely ancestry from Niger-Kordofanian and Nilo-Saharan (Sudanic) speaking groups, with lower amounts of West-Eurasian ancestry. 

Triska, Petr et al. (2015) showed that there is extensive admixture across the Sahel Belt, with the Fula carrying West African and East African components, as well as a Mozabite/North African component. These results support the hypothesis of a North African origin and a Western to Central Africa past migration for Fulani.

A full genome analysis was conducted by Vicente et al. in 2019, analyzing several different Fulani subgroups from various geographic regions. They found that the Fulani people are characterized by the admixture of local West African and East African components, but also display West-Eurasian admixture, mediated through historical North African groups. The West-Eurasian ancestry among Fulani was estimated to a mean average of 21,4% among the 53 samples from Ziniaré in Burkina Faso.  According to the authors, there were two admixture events, the first being about 2000 years ago, with the second being more recent at around 300 years ago. This Eurasian ancestry was observed in the ancestry components of Mozabite people. They found that: "Our findings suggest that Eurasian admixture and the European LP allele was introduced into the Fulani through contact with a North African population/s. We furthermore confirm the link between the lactose digestion phenotype in the Fulani to the MCM6/LCT locus by reporting the first GWAS of the lactase persistence trait. e observed a T-13910 allele frequency of 48.0%, while the genome-wide European admixture fraction in the Fulani is 21.4% at K = 3. The notable European admixture fraction in the Fulani coupled with the high frequencies of the LP T-13910 allele suggests the possibility of adaptive gene flow into the Fulani gene pool". Another study in 2020 by Priehodová et al., suggest an older date for the introduction of one variant of the LP allele in the Sahel, about ~8.5 ka.

A study in 2019 by Fan et al., found that the Fulani sampled from Cameroon, clustered with Afro-Asiatic speakers from East Africa in the phylogenetic analysis, which the authors said indicates a potential shift in language to Niger-Congo. The analysis on autosomal markers found traces of West Eurasian-related ancestry in this population, which suggests a North African or East African origin (as North and East Africans also have such ancestry likely related to expansions of farmers and herders from the Near East) and is consistent with the presence at moderate frequency of the −13,910T variant associated with lactose tolerance in European populations.

Notable Fulanis

See also
Toucouleur people or Torodbe
Jobawa
Sullubawa
Dogon people

References

General references
Almanach de Bruxelles (now a paying site)
 Gordon, Raymond G., Jr. (ed.) (2005): "Adamawa Fulfulde". Ethnologue: Languages of the World, 15th ed. Dallas: SIL International. Accessed 25 June 2006.
 Ndukwe, Pat I., Ph.D. (1996). Fulani. New York: The Rosen Publishing Group, Inc.
 Christiane Seydou, (ed.) (1976). Bibliographie générale du monde peul. Niamey, Institut de Recherche en Sciences Humaines du Niger

Further reading
Prof. Mark D. DeLancey's Fulbe studies bibliography, accessed 25 March 2008.
, chapter XVI – The Fulani in West African History, pp. 130–135; chapter XVII – Origins of the Fulani, pp. 136–152.
Can an Alphabet Save a Future? - Story of the Barry brother's 30-year commitment to developing a native script and font, giving the Fulani people a digital footprint for a global community - published on Microsoft Unlocked

External links

 fulfulde social learning network fulfulde Nigeria
 missionafrica.org.uk
 Portal of Fulɓe history and culture 
 Online magazine published/edited in Fulfulde
 Online magazine published/edited in Fulfulde
 Online magazine in Fulfulde
 Online fulfulde Dictionary
 Fulfulde online news sitel
 Portal of Fulɓe Fuuta Jaloo history and culture
Geerewol, by Sandrine Loncke (Website about Woɗaaɓe ritual celebrations, with annotated music recordings and short videos featuring dance and ritual sequences. Supplement to the book of the same author)
Online musical archives dedicated to Fulɓe Jelgooɓe (Burkina Faso) and Fulɓe Woɗaaɓe (Niger) musics and singings (Telemeta, CREM-CNRS)

 
People
Ethnic groups in Burkina Faso
Ethnic groups in Cameroon
Ethnic groups in the Central African Republic
Ethnic groups in Chad
Ethnic groups in Ivory Coast
Ethnic groups in the Gambia
Ethnic groups in Guinea
Ethnic groups in Mali
Ethnic groups in Mauritania
Ethnic groups in Niger
Ethnic groups in Nigeria
Ethnic groups in Senegal
Ethnic groups in Sierra Leone
Ethnic groups in Sudan
Ethnic groups in Togo
Muslim communities in Africa
Muslim ethnoreligious groups in Africa
Afroasiatic peoples
West African people